Mariel is a feminine given name, a diminutive of Mary and influenced by Muriel.

List of persons with the given name
Mariel Hemingway, American actress and writer, granddaughter of writer Ernest Hemingway
Mariel Maciá (born 1980), Argentine-Spanish film director, theater director, screenwriter and producer
Mariel Pamintuan, Filipino actress, singer and model
Mariel Rodriguez, Filipino commercial model, endorser, TV host, former MTV VJ and actress
Mariel Zagunis, American Olympic sabre fencer

Other uses
"Mariel", a song by Fiona on her 1989 album Heart Like a Gun
Mariel is also the name of the main character in Brian Jacques' book, Mariel of Redwall.

See also
Marielle (given name)

References

Feminine given names